Biddlesden was a Cistercian abbey founded in 1147 by Arnold de Bosco (de Bois), steward to the Earl of Leicester. Abbot William Wibert was deposed in 1198 for fraud, gross immorality and bribery. In the 14th to 15th centuries there was a long running dispute with the parish of Wappenham concerning the collection of tithes. It was never a wealthy house for most of its history and would have been dissolved in 1536 if the monks had not petitioned, and paid, for its continuation. The monastery was finally surrendered in September 1538 and became the possession of Thomas Lord Wriothesley. 

In the 1730s, the ruins of the abbey were demolished and a house built upon the site, Biddlesden Park House, now a grade II listed building. A few stones from the abbey remain but not in situ.

Burials 
William la Zouche, 1st Baron Zouche
William la Zouche, 2nd Baron Zouche 
William la Zouche, 3rd Baron Zouche (c. 1355 – 4 May 1396)
William la Zouche, 6th Baron Zouche, 7th Baron St Maur

References 

 Anthony New. 'A Guide to the Abbeys of England And Wales', p67. Constable.
'Houses of Cistercian monks: The abbey of Biddlesden', A History of the County of Buckingham: Volume 1 (1905), pp. 365–69
 Giraldus Cambrensis, Opera, eds. J.S. Brewer, J.F. Dimock and G.F. Warner [8 vols., 1861-91], Volume 1, 95, 102, 207, 210, 213, 216–7, 293–4.

1147 establishments in England
Religious organizations established in the 1140s
1538 disestablishments in England
Cistercian monasteries in England
Monasteries in Buckinghamshire
Christian monasteries established in the 12th century